Musical Dome  is a 1,640-seat theatre in Cologne, North Rhine-Westphalia, Germany. It opened in October 1996.

References

Theatres in Cologne